Todd Stewart Wolfe (born January 22, 1957 in Queens, New York, United States) is an American blues rock guitarist and singer-songwriter.

His professional career spanned for a period of three decades and had released numerous albums with his own band in the blues and rock genre.   He has also worked as the lead guitarist for Carla Olson from 1991 to 1993 and for Sheryl Crow from 1993 to 1998.

As a writer, Wolfe's songs have been covered by Faith Hill, Stevie Nicks, Deborah Coleman, and others.

Since departing Sheryl Crow's band, Wolfe has focused on his career as a solo artist and guitarist touring North America and Europe extensively.

Early life
Wolfe's father who was from New York and his mother from Marshall, Texas contributed to the development of his musical tastes. The different styles of music regularly heard in the Wolfe household encouraged Todd's love of music. Like many Americans of that era, the appearance of the Beatles on The Ed Sullivan Show accelerated Wolfe's growing appreciation for music. He was also inspired by the works of George Harrison and John Lennon since he was young. His appreciation deepened with the arrival in the United States of the British Invasion with bands such as The Animals, The Dave Clark Five, The Yardbirds and The Rolling Stones.

After the arrival of the second "British Invasion" and the play of Eric Clapton and the Cream, the Jimi Hendrix Experience, British guitarists such as Peter Green, Mick Taylor and Jeff Beck, and the emergence of American guitarists such as Johnny Winter, Mike Bloomfield, and Leslie West, Wolfe began to develop his own skills as a guitarist.  At age thirteen, he purchased his first guitar, a Dakota red Fender Mustang, and began learning the fundamentals of playing a guitar.  Two key components to his apprenticeship were attending numerous concerts and listening to records.  From these experiences, Wolfe's interests expanded to include the works of American blues guitarists such as B.B. King, Freddy King, Otis Rush, Hubert Sumlin, Buddy Guy, and Albert King.  Wolfe found similar inspiration in the electric blues of Muddy Waters and Howlin' Wolf bands.  These artists, whose works are often noted to have influenced some British musicians, were equally inspirational to Wolfe.

By the time he was sixteen, Wolfe had committed to developing his skills as a guitarist. At the same time, he began to refine his artistic sensibility, drawing on the foundations laid by musicians in the United States and Great Britain.

Early career
In 1979, Wolfe began his career by playing in garage bands.  He played at local parties and participated in "battle of the bands" competitions.  While still in high school, Wolfe put together his first band.  Four years later, he formed his first club band, Nitetrain.  The band included Wolfe and fellow Forest Hills residents, drummer Steven Menasche and bassist Emil Samuels. During their first year, the band opened for Albert Collins, Dickey Betts, and Walter "Wolfman" Washington.

Four years later, he formed his second club band, Troy & the Tornados. This band opened for many acts appearing in the metropolitan New York area.  These groups included Gregg Allman, The Outlaws, Dickey Betts, Johnny Winter, Robin Trower, and The Neville Brothers.

During his time with Troy & the Tornados, Wolfe remained a guitarist, as he was focused on developing his virtuosity as a musician. In this same interval, Wolfe met two women: Carla Olson of the Textones and Sheryl Crow. At that time, Crow was working as an in-studio back-up singer. She was introduced to Wolfe by Stephen "Scooter" Weintraub, who would later manage both artists. Immediately Wolfe and Crow began collaborating in studio sessions in New York City, eventually travelling to Los Angeles to form a band, in the hopes of earning a record deal.

Although the pair failed to earn a record contract, Wolfe used the opportunity to relocate permanently to Los Angeles, and to change the lineup of his band.  Troy & the T's played in "holes in the wall" throughout Southern California. During this time, Wolfe also began to score music for the Playboy Channel.  In 1991, Wolfe began to work with Olson, whom he had met while still in New York.  Wolfe accepted Olson's invitation to join her band as lead guitarist, a spot he held for the next two years.

In 1993, Crow offered Wolfe the lead guitar spot in the touring band she was forming to support her debut album, Tuesday Night Music Club.  Based upon her earlier work with Wolfe, Crow thought that his dynamic stage presence would bring an additional measure of excitement to her live shows.  During the next five years, Crow and her band would sojourn from "all in the van" tours of local establishments to a string of world tours in which they opened for performers such as Bob Dylan, The Rolling Stones, The Eagles, Plant & Page, and Elton John.  In 1996, Wolfe co-wrote with Sheryl Crow "Hard to Make a Stand," which appeared on Crow's eponymously titled second album, Sheryl Crow.

In 1995, while a member of Crow's band, Wolfe created his own band which signed with A & M Records.  The band, Mojoson, included Wolfe as the lead guitarist, Scott Bryan (a fellow member of Crow's band) as guitarist, keyboards and lead vocalist, bassist Eric Massimino and drummer Michael Lawrence, who also played for Sun 60.  Over a three-year period, the band recorded two studio albums.  However, A&M underwent a transition of ownership before the albums were released.  Consequently, the label's "takeover" albums went unissued, Mojoson's contract was dissolved, and the band was disbanded.

In 1998, Wolfe left Sheryl Crow's band to focus on forming a new band. The band included two former members of Mojoson, Eric Massimino and Michael Lawrence, as well as Rich Pagano, Dave Hollingsworth, and others.  Currently, Wolfe's band features drummer Roger Voss and bassist Justine Gardner who replaced Massimino, Lawrence and Suavek Zaniesienko. This lineup recorded Wolfe's sixth (studio) release since leaving Sheryl's band, Stripped Down at The Bang Palace.  Wolfe and his band in the last 10 years have released six albums and held over a dozen tours of Europe.

Present career
In August 2013, Wolfe released his seventh studio album titled Miles To Go. In September 2013 the album reached No. 15 on the Jam Band Radio Charts.

Discography

Additional credits

References

External links
 
 Artist Connection Podcast Interview December 2011

1957 births
Living people
People from Queens, New York
American blues guitarists
American male guitarists
Blues rock musicians
American blues singer-songwriters
Singer-songwriters from New York (state)
Guitarists from New York (state)
20th-century American guitarists
20th-century American male musicians
American male singer-songwriters